Igor Martínez Caseras (born 19 July 1989) is a Spanish former professional footballer who played mainly as an attacking midfielder.

Club career
Martínez was born in Vitoria-Gasteiz, Álava. After beginning his career at hometown's Deportivo Alavés, in the second and third divisions, he moved to Basque neighbours Athletic Bilbao in the summer of 2010, for €200,000 and a three-year contract. He was initially assigned to the reserve side, also in the third level.

On 18 September 2010, Martínez made his official debut with the first-team, starting and playing 70 minutes in a 2–2 away draw against Sporting de Gijón. He only appeared in a combined ten La Liga matches in his first two seasons, however.

Martínez scored his first goal for Athletic on 30 August 2012, in a UEFA Europa League qualifying round game at HJK Helsinki, netting the last in a 3–3 draw (9–3 aggregate win). Released in 2013, he resumed his career in division two with CD Mirandés and CD Lugo.

He returned to Minandés in 2017, and played for UD Melilla in the 2018–19 season.

In July 2019 Martínez joined to Real Balompédica Linense.

Martínez retired as a footballer on 6 October 2020 because a serious injury.

References

External links

1989 births
Living people
Footballers from Vitoria-Gasteiz
Spanish footballers
Association football midfielders
La Liga players
Segunda División players
Segunda División B players
Deportivo Alavés players
Bilbao Athletic footballers
Athletic Bilbao footballers
CD Mirandés footballers
CD Lugo players
UD Melilla footballers
Real Balompédica Linense footballers
Spain youth international footballers